Boyd Kjeld van der Vuurst de Vries (born 16 August 1999) is a Dutch professional basketball player, who currently plays for Landstede Hammers of the BNXT League.

Professional career
Van der Vuurst de Vries made his debut in the Dutch Basketball League (DBL) in the 2017–18 season with newcomer Den Helder Suns. In his rookie season, he won the DBL MVP Under 23 award for the best league's player under age 23. Additionally, he was also named DBL Rookie of the Year of the season. After the 2020–21 season, he won the DBL MVP Under 23 a second time after a season in which he led the Suns in scoring with 14.7 points per game.

On 10 August 2021, Van der Vuurst de Vries signed with Belgian club Okapi Aalst. On 22 December, he signed with AB Castelló of the LEB Oro.

On 13 June 2022, he signed with Landstede Hammers.

International career
Van der Vuurst de Vries played for the U18 and U16 Netherlands national basketball team. On 12 November 2022, he made his senior debut for the Netherlands senior team in a 77–96 home loss to Ukraine.

Personal
Boyd is the older brother of Keye, who plays professionally for Oostende.

References

1999 births
Living people
AB Castelló players
Den Helder Suns players
Dutch Basketball League players
Dutch men's basketball players
Landstede Hammers players
Okapi Aalstar players
Point guards
Shooting guards
Sportspeople from Delft
Dutch expatriate basketball people in Belgium
Dutch expatriate basketball people in Spain